Diego Tinoco (born November 25, 1997) is an American actor. He is best known for playing Cesar Diaz in Netflix series On My Block.

Filmography

Films

Television

Accolades

References 

Living people
1997 births
21st-century American male actors
American male film actors
American male web series actors
American male television actors
American male actors of Mexican descent
American people of Colombian descent
American people of Ecuadorian descent